Synchiropus grandoculis, the Western Australian bigeye dragonet, is a species of fish in the family Callionymidae, the dragonets. It is found in the Eastern Indian Ocean along Western Australia.

Etymology
The name of the fish comes from grandis meaning large, and oculus, meaning eye, referring to its "unusually large" eyes.

References

grandoculis
Fish of the Pacific Ocean
Fish of East Asia
Taxa named by Ronald Fricke
Fish described in 2000